Moses Ros-Suárez (born 1958) is a Dominican-American architect, sculptor, painter, printmaker and muralist who lives and works in New York City.

His work combines African, African American, Latino, and Caribbean identities. His art often includes text in both English and Spanish and features figures evoking Indians, conquerors and urban characters in places like the streets of New York or the beaches of Dominican Republic.

Early life and education
Ros was born in the United States to Dominican parents. Ros received a bachelor's degree in architecture from the Pratt Institute and is a licensed architect in the state of New York. He incorporates his knowledge of architecture into his numerous sculptural designs for community centers, daycare facilities, and other public spaces.

Career
His work is influenced by several art movements such as pop-art, French realism, abstraction and post-modern expressionism. It has a social and human context in its reflection of urban narratives of his contemporary times.

His printed collages combine recycled packaging and marketing materials of food and hygiene brands that blend the New York experience and his memories of childhood.

Ros is a member of the ArteLatAm, a collective of Latin American artists living in New York

Exhibitions
He has had one-person exhibitions at museums in the United States and the Caribbean, including the Bronx Museum of the Arts, the Yeshiva University Museum in New York, the Paterson Museum in New Jersey, and el Instituto de Cultura y Arte in Santiago, Republica Dominicana.

Public art
Ros has created large-scale public art commissions for the City of New York and other urban centers in the United States. Awarded commissions for public sculpture include the New York Department of Cultural Affairs, the Bronx Council for the Arts, and the New York City Housing Authority, as well as for stained-glass windows for the Metropolitan Transit Authority.

Ros designed a large-scale stained-glass window titled Patriasana which is located at the Fordham Road station, Bronx, New York.

He created Love Supreme, a site-specific large-scale paper art installations in the windows of Fordham Plaza and was inspired by the Black Lives Matter movement.

Ross was commissioned by the Sugar Hill Children's Museum of Art & Storytelling to create a mural as a symbol of a protest for social justice. His work depicted three themes of social justice: class, race, and power.

He designed Unity Bridge as part of the exhibition River Rising at Starlight Park in the Bronx, New York. The work, which incorporates ceramic artworks created at the Bronx River Art Center, celebrates the cultural and artistic expression of the surrounding community.

Collections
Smithsonian American Art Museum
Hood Museum of Art, Hanover, New Hampshire
New York City Housing Authority

References

External links 
 Official site

Living people
Dominican Republic artists
21st-century African-American artists
21st-century American artists
1958 births